The Czech men's national inline hockey team is the national team for the Czech Republic. The Czechs have won two medals at the IIHF Inline Hockey World Championships, despite the fact that NHL players have frequently been on the team roster. Most recently, the team finished seventh at the 2007 Men's World Inline Hockey Championships.

2008 World Championship team

IIHF World Championship results by year
1996 Minneapolis and St. Paul – 8th place
1997 Anaheim – 5th place
1998 Bratislava – 10th place (2nd in Group B)
1999 no tournament
2000 Hradec Kralové and Choceň – Silver Medal 
2001 Ellenton – Bronze Medal 
2002 Nürnberg and Pfaffenhofen – 4th place
2003 Nürnberg and Amberg – 4th place
2004 Bad Tölz – 6th place
2005 Kuopio – 4th place
2006 Budapest – 5th place
2007 Landshut and Passau – 7th place
2008 Bratislava – 5th place
2009 Ingolstadt – 6th place
2010 Karlstadt – Silver Medal 
2011 Pardubice – Gold Medal 
2012 Ingolstadt – 6th place
2013 Dresden – 5th place
2014 Pardubice – 5th place
2015 Tampere – 6th place
2016 no tournament
2017 Bratislava – Bronze Medal

FIRS World Championship results by year
1995 Chicago – 5th place
1996 Roccaraso – not participated
1997 Zell am See – 4th place
1998 Winnipeg – Bronze Medal 
1999 Thun, Wichtrach – Bronze Medal 
2000 Amiens – Bronze Medal 
2001 Torrevieja – Silver Medal 
2002 Rochester – Bronze Medal 
2003 Písek – Silver Medal 
2004 London – 4th place
2005 Paris – Silver Medal 
2006 Detroit – Silver Medal 
2007 Bilbao – Gold Medal 
2008 Ratingen – Bronze Medal 
2009 Varese – Bronze Medal 
2010 Beroun – Bronze Medal 
2011 Roccaraso – Gold Medal 
2012 Bucaramanga – Bronze Medal 
2013 Anaheim – Gold Medal 
2014 Toulouse – Silver Medal 
2015 Rosario – Gold Medal 
2016 Asiago, Roana – Gold Medal 
2017 Nanjing – Bronze Medal 
2018 Asiago, Roana – Gold Medal

FIRS World Championship results by year
2005 Duisburg – 5th place
2009 Kaohsiung – Bronze Medal 
2013 Cali – Bronze Medal 
2017 Wrocław – Gold Medal

References
 https://web.archive.org/web/20110611091156/http://www.usahockey.com/Template_UsahockeyInline.aspx?NAV=TU_02_04&id=231968

External links
USA Hockey Inline official website

Inline hockey in the Czech Republic
National inline hockey teams
Inline Hockey Men
Men's sport in the Czech Republic